Alessio Lo Porto (born 4 April 1996) is an Italian footballer who plays as a defender for Trastevere .

Club career
He made his Serie B debut for Perugia on 28 October 2014 in a game against Avellino.

On 7 September 2019, he joined Arzignano.

International career
Lo Porto was a youth international for Italy U-19.

References

External links
 

1996 births
Living people
Footballers from Rome
Italian footballers
Association football defenders
Serie B players
Serie C players
Serie D players
A.C. Perugia Calcio players
Ternana Calcio players
A.C. Tuttocuoio 1957 San Miniato players
A.S. Gubbio 1910 players
F.C. Arzignano Valchiampo players
F.C. Rieti players
Italy youth international footballers